Aechmea squarrosa is a species of flowering plant in the Bromeliaceae family'. This species is endemic to the State of Rio de Janeiro in southeastern Brazil.

References

squarrosa
Flora of Brazil
Plants described in 1889
Taxa named by John Gilbert Baker